is a Japanese voice actress. She played her first main role in 2018 as Ichigo in the anime series Darling in the Franxx. Ichinose went on to headline Mobile Suit Gundam: The Witch from Mercury in 2022 as Suletta Mercury, the franchise's first female protagonist of a TV anime.

Biography

In 2021, Ichinose was one of the recipients of the Best New Actress Award at the 15th Seiyu Awards.

Filmography

TV anime
2018
Darling in the Franxx (Ichigo)
Iroduku: The World in Colors (Asagi Kazeno)
Aikatsu Friends! (Chihori Kumano)

2019
Boogiepop and Others (Aya Arihata)
Kaguya-sama: Love Is War (Maki Shijo)
Hitori Bocchi no Marumaru Seikatsu (Kako Kurai)
Fairy Gone (Marlya Noel)
Carole & Tuesday (Tuesday Simmons)
To the Abandoned Sacred Beasts (Miglieglia)
Dr. Stone (Yuzuriha Ogawa)
Senki Zesshō Symphogear XV (Elsa)

2020
If My Favorite Pop Idol Made It to the Budokan, I Would Die (Reina)
Gleipnir (Chihiro Yoshioka)
Shachibato! President, It's Time for Battle! (Yutoria)
Mewkledreamy (Yuri Sawamura)
Kaguya-sama: Love Is War? (Maki Shijo)
Golden Kamuy 3rd Season (Enonoka)
Akudama Drive (Sister)

2021
Dr. Stone: Stone Wars (Yuzuriha Ogawa)
Higehiro (Sayu Ogiwara)
The Saint's Magic Power Is Omnipotent (Aira Misono)
Amaim Warrior at the Borderline (Shion Shishibe)

2022
Trapped in a Dating Sim: The World of Otome Games Is Tough for Mobs (Olivia)
In the Heart of Kunoichi Tsubaki (Tachiaoi)
Kaguya-sama: Love Is War – Ultra Romantic (Maki Shijo)
Love After World Domination (Drone Rabbit)
Made in Abyss: The Golden City of the Scorching Sun (Maaa)
Extreme Hearts (Michelle Jaeger)
Mobile Suit Gundam: The Witch from Mercury (Suletta Mercury, Ericht Samaya)
Do It Yourself!! (Purin)

2023
Ayakashi Triangle (Suzu Kanade)
In/Spectre 2nd Season (Marumi Oki)
The Saint's Magic Power Is Omnipotent 2nd Season (Aira Misono)

Animated films
 Weathering with You (2019), Sasaki
 Kaguya-sama: Love Is War – The First Kiss That Never Ends (2022), Maki Shijo

Video games
2018
Kirara Fantasia (Nijou Omi)

2019
Final Fantasy XIV - Shadowbringers (Ryne)
Magia Record (Mikura Komachi)

2020
 #COMPASS (Luruca)
 Action Taimanin (Yozora Hanasaki)
 Azur Lane (USS Ticonderoga, USS Bunker Hill)
 Girls' Frontline (MK 12) (Scout)
 Samurai Shodown (Gongsun Li)

2021
 Kanda Alice mo Suiri Suru. (Alice Kanda)
 Tsukihime -A piece of blue glass moon- (Hisui)
 RED:Pride of Eden (Droia)

2022
 Alchemy Stars (Bethel)
 Soul Tide 2021 (Amane Inori)
 Brave Nine (Devi)
 World II World'' (Raqqa)
 ' 'Onmyoji ' ' ( Shiki)

References

External links
Official agency profile 
 Old is Sayu Genshin

1996 births
Living people
Japanese video game actresses
Japanese voice actresses
Seiyu Award winners
Voice actresses from Hokkaido
21st-century Japanese actresses